The Dominica skink (Mabuya dominicana) is a species of skink found in Dominica. On Dominica, it can be confused with Gymnophthalmus pleii or juvenile Ameiva fuscata due to their similar appearance.

References

Mabuya
Reptiles described in 1887
Reptiles of Dominica
Taxa named by Samuel Garman